Savignano may refer to several places in Italy:

Savignano Irpino, a municipality in the Province of Avellino, Campania
Savignano sul Panaro, a municipality in the Province of Modena, Emilia-Romagna
Savignano sul Rubicone, a municipality in the Province of Forlì-Cesena, Emilia-Romagna
Savignano (Pomarolo), a hamlet of Pomarolo (TN), Trentino-South Tyrol
Savignano (Vaiano), a hamlet of Vaiano (PO), Tuscany